Soldak Entertainment is a small independent company that was founded by Steven Peeler on November 22, 2004. The company released Windows Depths of Peril on September 5, 2007, followed by  a Mac version of the game on June 6, 2008. On November 3, 2008, the company released their first dual platform game Kivi's Underworld, with the expansion being issued 6 months later on June 9, 2009. Their second dual platform game, Din's Curse was released on March 31, 2010. Their third full game, known as "Drox Operative" was released on November 29, 2012.

Games developed
Depths of Peril
Kivi's Underworld
Din's Curse
Din's Curse: Demon War
Drox Operative
Zombasite
Din's Legacy (2019)
Drox Operative 2

References

External links
 Official site
 Companies bio on the official site
 http://www.soldak.com/Blogs/Steven.html

Video game companies of the United States
Video game companies established in 2004